Roger Dennistoun "Dennis" Poore (19 August 1916, Paddington, London – 12 February 1987, Kensington) was a British entrepreneur, financier and sometime racing driver. He became chairman of NVT during the dying days of the old British motorcycle industry.

Family
His father, Roger Poore, DSO, was killed in action in World War I on 26 September 1917.   On 24 March 1949, Dennis Poore married Peta Coast. They had one daughter, Victoria Borwick MP.

Motorsport career
Poore was a keen motor sport participant, and competed in two World Championship Grands Prix in 1952. He made his debut in the British Grand Prix on 19 July 1952, where he finished fourth. He scored 3 championship points. Poore won the British Hill Climb Championship in 1950 driving a 3.8-litre twin-Wade-blown Alfa Romeo. He finished second at Shelsley Walsh, first at Prescott, second at Bo'ness, taking the win at Rest and Be Thankful, then second at Bouley Bay and first at Val des Terres, rounding off the season with another win at Prescott. After his World Championship Grands Prix, Poore raced sportscars for Aston Martin, winning the Goodwood International Nine Hour race with a DB3S in 1955, co-driven by Peter Walker.

Poore used his personal wealth to bankroll the founding, in 1950, of the motor racing journal Autosport.

NVT career
Poore became chairman of Manganese Bronze Holdings PLC, an engineering company primarily concerned with making marine propellers. Poore later sold off the propeller business and used the funds to buy up a motley collection failing British motorcycle companies, Associated Motor Cycles, Norton, AJS, James, Francis-Barnett, Matchless, and engine manufacturers Villiers.

Following the collapse of BSA in 1972, the motorcycle interests of Manganese Bronze and BSA/Triumph were merged into Norton Villiers Triumph Ltd.  Poore was made chairman of NVT and he quickly sold off BSA's substantial non-motorcycle interests.  NVT was assisted by substantial aid from the Government, who were anxious to stave off the collapse of the British motorcycle industry.  Poore's restructuring became rather draconian, making 3,000 of the 4,500 workforce redundant.  This led to the creation of the Meriden Cooperative which operated for ten years until it became bankrupt.  Production of BSA bikes (the A65 twin and the A75 triple) ceased, and with Triumph lost to the Cooperative, the sole NVT model was the Norton Commando.  Although this machine won the Motor Cycle News "Bike of the Year" award for several years running, nothing could hide the fact that the Commando was an old design, being a pre-unit pushrod parallel-twin.  Eventually Commando production ended and NVT ended up assembling an Asian 125cc trail bike.  However, Norton went on to produce a twin-rotor Wankel-engined bike based on David Garside's work at BSA.

Compared with BSA's hopeless management team who had led their once-mighty company to ruin through incompetence, dire business decisions and a failure even to appreciate bikes, Poore at first seemed a breath of fresh air who could be the hoped-for saviour of the British motorcycle industry. His sporting past showed he was in tune with motorsport and engineering.  However, his reconstruction and redundancy plans were heavy-handed and some regarded him a little more than an asset-stripper.  What is clear is that his actions led to the fragmentation of the industry when consolidation was essential to save the day.

London cabs
With the purchase of BSA came its subsidiary Carbodies, builder of the FX4 London taxi; the classic "black cab". After disposing of the motorcycle manufacturing arms, Poore continued to head Manganese Bronze as a taxi and component manufacturer until his death in 1987.

Complete World Drivers' Championship results
(key)

References

External links 
 Dennis Poore's Alfa Romeo 8C 35 Photographs and information about the 8C-35 (chassis 50013) that Poore owned for many years.

1916 births
1987 deaths
English racing drivers
Brighton Speed Trials people
British hillclimb drivers
English Formula One drivers
Connaught Formula One drivers
24 Hours of Le Mans drivers
Royal Air Force personnel of World War II
British World War II pilots
World Sportscar Championship drivers
20th-century English businesspeople